Tokorozawa Municipal Gymnasium is an arena in Tokorozawa, Saitama, Japan. It is the home arena of the Saitama Broncos of the B.League, Japan's professional basketball league.

References

Basketball venues in Japan
Indoor arenas in Japan
Saitama Broncos
Sports venues in Saitama Prefecture
Buildings and structures in Tokorozawa, Saitama
Sports venues completed in 2004
2004 establishments in Japan